Boomerang is a television channel broadcast in the Nordic countries. A sister service of Cartoon Network, the channel airs classic and modern cartoons aimed at children.

History
In late 2005, Turner Broadcasting System Europe reported that they had intended to launch the channel in the Nordic region. They had also applied for a to broadcast Boomerang in the Swedish digital terrestrial network in the fall of 2005. Boomerang was, however, not granted a license by the Swedish government at the time.

The channel launched on April 1, 2011 from the Canal Digital platform. Boomerang had previously been offered as a programming block on Cartoon Network.

On September 30, 2010, it was launched as a channel on Viasat's satellite platform.

On January 19, 2015, Boomerang Nordic applied the 2014-15 rebrand.

In January 2022, it was announced that Cartoonito also coming to Boomerang on 1 February 2022.

Logos

Programming

Current 
 Be Cool, Scooby-Doo!
 Ben 10 (2016 TV series)
 Grizzy and the Lemmings
 Looney Tunes Cartoons
 Mighty Mike
 Mr. Bean: The Animated Series
 New Looney Tunes
 Scooby-Doo and Guess Who?
 Scooby-Doo! Mystery Incorporated
 The Looney Tunes Show
 The Tom and Jerry Show (2014 TV series)
 Tom and Jerry in New York
 What's New, Scooby-Doo?

Cartoonito block 
 Lucas the Spider
 Masha and the Bear
 Moley
 Mush-Mush & the Mushables
 Thomas & Friends
 Thomas & Friends: All Engines Go

Former 
 Alice & Lewis
 A Pup Named Scooby-Doo 
 Baby Looney Tunes 
 Bananas in Pyjamas
 Bob the Builder
 Bunnicula
 Camp Lazlo
 City of Friends
 Cocomelon 
 Cow & Chicken
 Curious George
 Dastardly and Muttley in Their Flying Machines
 Dexter's Laboratory
 Droopy, Master Detective
 Dorothy and the Wizard of Oz
 Duck Dodgers
 Firehouse Tales
 Fosters Home For Imaginary Friends
 Hong Kong Phooey
 I Am Weasel
 Inspector Gadget (2015)
 Jelly Jamm
 Johnny Bravo
 Kingdom Force
 Lamput
 LazyTown
 Looney Tunes
 Mike, Lu & Og
 My Knight and Me
 My Little Pony: Friendship is Magic
 Ninja Express
 Oddbods
 Pat the Dog
 Pingu
 Pink Panther and Pals
 Pinky and the Brain
 Pound Puppies (2010 TV series)
 Puppy in My Pocket: Adventures in Pocketville
 Scooby-Doo, Where Are You!
 Shaun the Sheep
 Sheep in the Big City
 Squirrel Boy
 Sylvester & Tweety Mysteries
 Taffy
 The Addams Family (1992 TV series)
 The Adventures of Chuck and Friends
 The Adventures of Puss in Boots
 The Flintstones
 The Garfield Show
 The Happos Family
 The Koala Brothers
 The Jetsons
 The Jungle Bunch
 The Owl & Co
 The Scooby-Doo Show
 The Smurfs
 The Zoo
 Time Squad
 Tom & Jerry 
 Tom & Jerry Kids 
 Tom and Jerry Tales
 Top Cat
 Two Stupid Dogs
 Wacky Races (2017 Remake) 
 What a Cartoon!
 Yabba-Dabba Dinosaurs

See also 

 Cartoonito (brand as a whole)
 List of international Cartoon Network channels
 List of programs broadcast by Boomerang
 List of programs broadcast by Cartoonito

References

External links
 All Nordic Countries Website
 Denmark Website
 Norway Website
 Sweden Website

Cartoonito
Boomerang (TV network)
2010 establishments in Denmark
2010 establishments in Norway
2010 establishments in Sweden
Pan-Nordic television channels
Television stations in Denmark
Television channels in Finland
Television channels in Iceland
Television channels in Norway
Television channels in Sweden
Television channels and stations established in 2010
Turner Broadcasting System Europe
Turner Broadcasting System Denmark
Turner Broadcasting System Norway
Turner Broadcasting System Sweden
Warner Bros. Discovery EMEA